David Finley Crockett is an American former professional wrestling announcer and executive from Charlotte, North Carolina.

Career
Crockett was usually paired in announcing duties with Tony Schiavone, with Crockett providing color commentary and Schiavone providing play-by-play announcing. From 1985 to 1988, Crockett and Schiavone were the announcing team for NWA World Championship Wrestling. David Crockett is remembered for being clotheslined by Nikita Koloff on World Wide Wrestling in 1985 in Asheville, North Carolina. This led to Ric Flair coming to Crockett's aid and gave birth to the second Flair/Koloff feud (they had a short-lived feud a year earlier in 1984 as the Mid-Atlantic and Georgia territories were merging under new booker, Dusty Rhodes) and their money-making bout at The Great American Bash 1985, held at the American Legion Memorial Stadium in Charlotte. When Jim Ross joined the show in 1988, Crockett stayed on but later left to become an executive producer for World Championship Wrestling television programming. Crockett also worked with Bob Caudle on Mid-Atlantic Championship Wrestling. Since 2021, Crockett has been involved in some All Elite Wrestling events in the Crockett territory, which occurred during AEW Holiday Bash in Greensboro, AEW Battle of the Belts in Charlotte, with the events held in Crockett-era venues. He also made an appearance on the January 12, 2022 episode of  AEW Dynamite in Raleigh, which was held in the  PNC Arena.

Crockett had a very brief career as a professional wrestler under the ring name Dave Finley.

Personal life

Crockett is the son of Jim Crockett and brother to Jim Crockett, Jr. 

Crockett was on board a private airplane that crashed on 4 October 1975 that also had Johnny Valentine, Bob Bruggers, Tim Woods and Flair on board. Crockett was the least injured of the men on board the plane, followed by Woods.

Awards and accomplishments
Wrestling Observer Newsletter awards
Most Obnoxious (1982, 1987)
Worst Television Announcer (1986–1988)

References

1946 births
American color commentators
American male professional wrestlers
Jim Crockett Promotions
Living people
Professional wrestling announcers
Professional wrestling executives
Sportspeople from Charlotte, North Carolina
Survivors of aviation accidents or incidents